Hadise is a Turkish-Belgian singer-songwriter. She has released seven studio albums, Sweat (2005), Hadise (2008), Fast Life (2009), Kahraman (2009), Aşk Kaç Beden Giyer? (2011), Tavsiye (2014) and Şampiyon (2017).

Hadise has received nominations in a variety of awards, including six TMF Awards, three Altın Kelebek Awards, two Kral TV Awards, one MTV Europe Music Awards and one Jetix Kids Awards. Her second single, "Stir Me Up", gave Hadise her first award win, an Altin Kelebek Award for Best New Act, in Turkey.

Altın Kelebek

Balkan Music Awards

Jetix Kids Award (Turkey)

Kral TV Awards

MIA Awards (Belgium)

MTV EMA Awards
The MTV Europe Music Awards (EMA) is an annual awards ceremony established in 1994 by MTV. Hadise has received one nomination.

TMF Awards (Belgium)
The TMF awards is an annual awards ceremony established in 1995 by TMF. Hadise has received ten nomination and of those ten has won two.

References

Hadise
Hadise